Glyceria leptostachya is a species of mannagrass known by the common names davy mannagrass and narrow mannagrass.

Distribution
It is native to western North America from Alaska to California, where it grows in wet places such as riverbanks.

Description
This rhizomatous perennial grass produces narrow stems approaching a maximum height of 1.5 meters. The leaves may be flat or rolled along the edges and they have ligules up to a centimeter long. The inflorescence is narrow and compact, bearing spikelets parallel to the stem instead of spreading outward. Each spikelet is one to two centimeters long and contains up to 14 or 15 florets with membranous margins.

References

External links 
 Jepson Manual Treatment
 USDA Plants Profile
 Photo gallery

leptostachya
Freshwater plants
Native grasses of California
Grasses of the United States
Grasses of Canada
Flora of Alaska
Flora of Oregon
Flora of Washington (state)